Events from the year 1749 in Scotland.

Incumbents

Law officers 
 Lord Advocate – William Grant of Prestongrange
 Solicitor General for Scotland – Patrick Haldane of Gleneagles, jointly with Alexander Hume

Judges 
 Lord President of the Court of Session – Lord Arniston the Elder
 Lord Justice General – Lord Ilay
 Lord Justice Clerk – Lord Tinwald

Events 
 5 January – James Wolfe is promoted to major in Peyton's Regiment of Foot, at this time stationed in Glasgow.
 6 March – A "corpse riot" breaks out in Glasgow after a body disappears from a churchyard in the Gorbals district. It is suspected that anatomy students at the Glasgow Infirmary "had raised a dead body from the grave and carried it to the college" for dissection. The city guard intervenes after a mob of protesters begin breaking windows at random buildings, and groups of citizens begin to make regular patrols of church graveyards.
 4 June – A fire in Glasgow leaves 200 families homeless.
 A stagecoach service opens between Edinburgh and Glasgow.
 The Treason Outlawries (Scotland) Act is passed.

Births 
 1 June – James Cunningham, 14th Earl of Glencairn, nobleman, soldier and patron (died 1791 in England)
 18 June – John Brown, miniature painter (died 1787)
 29 August – Gilbert Blane, naval physician (died 1834 in England)
 6 September – Benjamin Bell, surgeon (died 1806)
 October – Archibald Skirving, portrait painter (died 1819)
 3 November – Daniel Rutherford, physician, chemist and botanist noted for the isolation of nitrogen (died 1819)
 7 November – Charles Smith, portrait painter (died 1824)
 8 December – Hugo Arnot, né Pollock, lawyer and campaigner (died 1786)
 15 December – James Graeme, poet (died 1772)
 John Cunningham, 15th Earl of Glencairn, nobleman, cavalry officer and priest (died 1796)
 Ralph Walker, civil engineer (died 1824 in England)

Deaths 
 18 April – Alexander Robertson of Struan, chief of Clan Donnachaidh, Jacobite leader and poet (born c. 1668/70)
 19 October – William Ged, goldsmith and inventor of stereotyping (born 1699)
 19 December – George Seton, 5th Earl of Winton, exiled Jacobite (born c. 1678; died in Italy)
 25 December – John Lindsay, 20th Earl of Crawford, 1st colonel of the Black Watch (born 1702)
 John Munro, 4th of Newmore, soldier and politician

See also 

 Timeline of Scottish history

References 

 
Years of the 18th century in Scotland
Scotland
1740s in Scotland